Josette Andrews (née Norris; born December 15, 1995) is an American middle to long-distance runner.

Raised in Tenafly, New Jersey, Norris graduated from Tenafly High School in 2014, where she won the Meet of Champions in the 1,600 meters event during her junior season.

NCAA championships
She competed for the North Carolina Tar Heels and Georgetown Hoyas. She competed at the NCAA Women's Division I Outdoor Track and Field Championships in Austin, Texas and placed fourth in the 5000m final.

Outdoor track and field

Professional
Norris chose to focus on the 5000m event in the 2020 US Olympic Trials, making it to the final but placing 8th and failing to make the Olympic team. Despite this disappointment, she attended the Sound Running Sunset Tour in Mission Viejo, California and ran a time under 4 minutes to set her personal best in the 1500m. Following the closure of the 2020 Olympic Games she attended two Diamond League events, Prefontaine Classic and Lausanne Athletissima, competing instead in the 1500m and placing 3rd in both. Having qualified for the Diamond League Final in Zürich, she attended to compete in the 1500m and earned a bronze medal there as well.

Personal life 
Andrews is married to professional runner and Olympian, Robby Andrews.

Competition record

USA National Championships

Track and Field

International Competitions

Track and Field

References

External links
 North Carolina bio
 Georgetown bio
 World Athletics bio

1995 births
Living people
American female middle-distance runners
American female long-distance runners
People from Tenafly, New Jersey
Sportspeople from Bergen County, New Jersey
Tenafly High School alumni
Track and field athletes from New Jersey
21st-century American women
North Carolina Tar Heels women's track and field athletes
Georgetown Hoyas women's track and field athletes